Copes Bay is an Arctic waterway in Qikiqtaaluk Region, Nunavut, Canada. It is located in Nares Strait by eastern Ellesmere Island, and marks the northern edge of Cook Peninsula.

Exploration
English adventurer David Hempleman-Adams passed through Copes Bay during his solo trek to the Geomagnetic North Pole in 2003.

References

 Copes Bay, Nunavut at Atlas of Canada

Bays of Qikiqtaaluk Region
Ellesmere Island